Mainly Spaniards were a 1980s New Zealand pop group led by guitarist/singer Richard James, who released an early 45, That's what friends are for, on the Flying Nun label.  A follow-up was recorded but never released after James moved to Auckland to work as a schoolteacher in late 1983.  He went on to perform and record in The Pterodactyls and The Letter 5.  In 2008, he formed The South Tonight with John Kelcher, late of Flying Nun band Sneaky Feelings, and with other Christchurch musicians.
 
Origin: New Zealand
Genres: Rock
Pop
 
Years active: 1981-1983
Associated: The Pterodactyls, The Letter 5, The South Tonight

Members
Richard James: Guitar, Vocals
Nick Strong: Bass, Vocals
David Swift: Drums, 1981-2
Tony Green: Drums, 1982-3
Mike Jeffries: Lead Guitar, 1981-2

Discography
That’s What Your Friends Are For, 1981, FN014
 
Currently available on Flying Nun boxset FNCD500/1.

References
Bannister, M. (1999) Positively George Street. Auckland: Reed Books. 
Dix, J. (1988) Stranded in paradise: New Zealand rock'n'roll 1955-1988. Wellington: Paradise Publications. .

New Zealand pop music groups